The Pummerer rearrangement is an organic reaction whereby an alkyl sulfoxide rearranges to an α-acyloxy–thioether (monothioacetal-ester) in the presence of acetic anhydride.

The stoichiometry of the reaction is:
RS(O)CHR'2  +  Ac2O   →   RSC(OAc)R'2  +  AcOH

Synthetic implementation
Aside from acetic anhydride, trifluoroacetic anhydride and trifluoromethanesulfonic anhydride have been employed as activators. Common nucleophiles besides acetates are arenes, alkenes, amides, and phenols.

The usage of α-acyl sulfoxides and Lewis acids, such as TiCl4 and SnCl4, allow the reaction to proceed at lower temperatures (0 °C).

Thionyl chloride can be used in place of acetic anhydride to trigger the elimination for forming the electrophilic intermediate and supplying chloride as the nucleophile to give an α-chloro-thioether:

Other anhydrides and acyl halides can give similar products. Inorganic acids can also give this reaction. This product can be converted to aldehyde or ketone by hydrolysis.

Mechanism
The mechanism of the Pummerer rearrangement begins with the acylation of the sulfoxide (resonance structures 1 and 2) by acetic anhydride to give 3, with acetate as byproduct.  The acetate then acts as a catalyst to induce an elimination reaction to produce the cationic-thial structure 4, with acetic acid as byproduct. Finally, acetate attacks the thial to give the final product 5.

The activated thial electrophile can be trapped by various intramolecular and intermolecular nucleophiles to form carbon–carbon bonds and carbon–heteroatom bonds.

The intermediate is so electrophilic that even neutral nucleophiles can be used, including aromatic rings with electron donating groups such as 1,3-benzodioxole:

It is possible to perform the rearrangement using selenium in the place of sulfur.

Pummerer fragmentation 
When a substituent on the α position can form a stable carbocation, this group rather than the α-hydrogen atom will eliminate in the intermediate step. This variation is called a Pummerer fragmentation.  This reaction type is demonstrated below with a set of sulfoxides and trifluoroacetic anhydride (TFAA):

The organic group "R2" shown in the diagram above on the bottom right is the methyl violet carbocation, whose pKR+ of 9.4 is not sufficient to out-compete loss of H+ and therefore a classical Pummerer rearrangement occurs. The reaction on the left is a fragmentation because the leaving group with pKR+ = 23.7 is particularly stable.

History

See also
 Organosulfur chemistry
 Polonovski reaction ― similar reaction involving an amine oxide
 Boekelheide reaction ― similar reaction involving a pyridine oxide

References

Rearrangement reactions
Name reactions